Muhammad Umer Hayat (born 22 September 1996) is a Pakistani footballer who currently plays for WAPDA F.C. in the Pakistan Premier League, and the Pakistani national team.

International career
Umer Hayat represented Pakistan at the youth level. He was named to the nation's 20-man squad for the 2018 SAFF Championship. He made his senior international debut on 4 September 2018 in the team's opening match of the tournament, a 2–1 victory over Nepal. The following year he was then named to Pakistan's squad for 2022 FIFA World Cup qualification matches against Cambodia, earning praise from local media for his performance at right-back.

International career statistics

References

External links
National Football Teams profile
Soccerway profile

Living people
1996 births
Pakistani footballers
Pakistan international footballers
Association football defenders